Bombay 405 Miles is a 1980 Indian Bollywood action drama film produced and directed by Brij Sadanah. It stars Vinod Khanna, Shatrughan Sinha and Zeenat Aman in pivotal roles. It was released on 2 May 1980.

Cast

Plot
Ordered to stay away from Delhi & Calcutta's border for five years, two convicts, Kishan and Kanhaiya, decide to go to Bombay which is 405 miles from the border, hence the title. While on a train, they come to the rescue of an elderly male with a female child, Munni. On his last breath, the elderly male asks them to take care of Munni as millions of rupees are involved. Greed overtakes both and they take the child with them in order to locate her next of kin. Unable to find anyone they advertise in the newspapers, and is contacted by Veer Singh, who answered the advertisement. What Kishan and Kanhaiya does not know is that officially Munni is already dead, along with her mother, and brother, purportedly killed by their father, Ranvir Singh, when he suspected his wife's fidelity,a plan executed by Veer Singh, Ranbir Singh's step brother. Kishan and Kanhaiya find themselves immersed in a web of lies and deceit as they try to fathom what the truth really is. But before they could get to the bottom of this matter, their lives themselves are under threat - by a man who will stop at nothing to get what he wants.

Notable incidents
During the making of the film, a duplicate of Shatrughan Sinha named Mansoor died accidentally. He had to jump across fire, but he fell into the fire and died. M. B. Shetty who was the composer of this scene thought he was responsible for Mansoor's death. He became an alcoholic, and died because of liver failure.

Soundtrack
Lyrics: Indeevar

References

External links

1980s Hindi-language films
1980 films
Films scored by Kalyanji Anandji
Films directed by Brij Sadanah